Solidago lancifolia, known as lance-leaf goldenrod, is a rare North American plant in the family Asteraceae. It is found only in the Appalachian Mountains of Virginia, Tennessee, and North Carolina.

Solidago lancifolia is a perennial herb sometimes as much as 160 cm (64 inches or 5 1/3 feet) tall. One plant can produce as many as 400 small yellow flower headss, borne in a large showy array at the top of the plant and also smaller groups on side branches. Each head contains 5-8 ray florets surrounding 5-12 disc florets.

References

lancifolia
Flora of the Southeastern United States
Plants described in 1842
Taxa named by John Torrey
Taxa named by Asa Gray
Taxa named by Alvan Wentworth Chapman
Flora without expected TNC conservation status